Aanchal Khurana is an Indian television actress. She is the winner of MTV Roadies (season 8), and has worked in Sapne Suhane Ladakpan Ke. She also appeared in episodes of Arjun, Savdhaan India, Aahat and C.I.D..

Early life
Aanchal Khurana hails from Delhi. She studied at The Air Force School, Subroto Park.

Filmography

Television

Web series

Awards and nominations

References

Living people
Actresses from Delhi
Indian television actresses
Indian web series actresses
Actresses in Hindi television
MTV Roadies contestants
Year of birth missing (living people)
21st-century Indian actresses